Steven GE Marsh BSc ARCS PhD FRCPath, is a British immunogeneticist and leader in the field of histocompatibility and immunogenetics having published more than 400 scientific papers on the subject. Marsh holds a professorship in the subject at University College London and the deputy directorship of research and leader of the HLA Informatics Group at the charity Anthony Nolan.

Marsh has made contributions to standardization of human leukocyte antigen nomenclature as Chair of the World Health Organization's Nomenclature Committee for Factors of the HLA System.

Publications 
 The HLA FactsBook [Paperback]  |  | Publication Date: January 5, 2000

References 

British geneticists
Academics of University College London
Living people
Year of birth missing (living people)